Özlem Becerikli (born March 21, 1980, in Balıkesir, Turkey) is a Turkish powerlifter of class PO competing in the -56 kg division, and a Paralympian. She is a member of the Kocaeli Büyükşehir Belediyesi Kağıtspor, where she is coached by Şule Şahbaz.

Career history
Becerikli took the bronze medal in the -52 kg division at the 2010 IPC Powerlifting World Championships held in Kuala Lumpur, Malesia. Özlem was the winner of another bronze medal taken at the Fazza International Powerlifting Championships in Dubai, United Arab Emirates in 2010. In 2011, she became bronze medalist at the Arafura Games in Darwin, Australia.

She won the bronze medal at the 2012 Paralympics.

Achievements

References

1980 births
Living people
Sportspeople from Balıkesir
Turkish powerlifters
Paralympic powerlifters of Turkey
Powerlifters at the 2012 Summer Paralympics
Paralympic bronze medalists for Turkey
Turkish sportswomen
Medalists at the 2012 Summer Paralympics
Female powerlifters
Paralympic medalists in powerlifting
21st-century Turkish sportswomen